"Whatever Happened to Corey Haim?" is the first single from Irish alternative rock band the Thrills' second album, Let's Bottle Bohemia (2004). It was released on 30 August 2004, reaching number 17 in Ireland and number 22 on the UK Singles Chart. The single closed out 2004 as BBC Radio 1's most requested track.

Track listing

Charts

See also
 Corey Haim

References

The Thrills songs
2004 singles
2004 songs
Song recordings produced by Dave Sardy
Virgin Records singles